Tagore Theatre, Chandigarh is a center for cultural performances located in Sector 18, Chandigarh. It was designed by architect Aditya Prakash, who was part of Chandigarh Capital Project Team, headed by Le Corbusier. Aditya Prakash was the principal of Chandigarh College of Architecture. Aditya Prakash has also designed a few residences in the city, one of which is in the same sector and is called Kailash Bhavan.

History

Named after Rabindranath Tagore, India's Nobel laureate, Tagore Theatre, being the sole theatre in Chandigarh for a long time, had become an important hub of cultural activities for the citizens of Chandigarh. Now it has been converted into an auditorium.

Design

Tagore theater with its blank brick walled cuboid structure, embodied the straight-line, had, over the years become an integral part of Chandigarh's Cityscape.

References

External links 
   Tagore Theatre on Architexturez South Asia
 Tagore Theatre Official website

Theatres in India
Buildings and structures in Chandigarh
Memorials to Rabindranath Tagore
Tourist attractions in Chandigarh